A Christmas Story Live! is an American television special that was originally broadcast by Fox on December 17, 2017. It was a live, televised musical remake of the 1983 film A Christmas Story, and incorporated the 2012 stage musical version A Christmas Story: The Musical. The live musical was executive produced by Marc Platt and Adam Siegel, directed by Scott Ellis and Alex Rudzinski, and starred Matthew Broderick, Andy Walken, Maya Rudolph, Chris Diamantopoulos, and Jane Krakowski.

Premise
A Christmas Story Live! is based on "the short stories of humorist Jean Shepherd and is set in 1940's Indiana. It follows 9-year-old Ralphie Parker and his unrelenting desire to get his hands on a Red Ryder BB gun for Christmas".

Cast and characters
The Parker Family
 Andy Walken as Ralphie Parker
 Matthew Broderick as Ralphie as an Adult
 Maya Rudolph as Mother
 Chris Diamantopoulos as The Old Man
 Tyler Wladis as Randy Parker
School characters
 Jane Krakowski as Miss Shields
 Sammy Ramirez as Schwartz
 JJ Batteast as Flick
 Sacha Carlson as Scut Farkus
 Elie Samouhi as Grover Dill
 Abigail Dylan Harrison as Louise
 Artyon Celestine as Richie
 Allie Kiesel as Mary Beth<ref
name="AdditionalCast"/> 
 Hayley Shukiar as Esther Jane
Other
 Ana Gasteyer as Mrs. Schwartz
 Ken Jeong as Tree Salesman/Restaurant Owner
 David Alan Grier as Mall Santa
 Fred Armisen as Mall Elf
 PrettyMuch as Hohman Indiana carolers

Musical numbers
Two songs were created exclusively for the live broadcast that were not present in the original Broadway production: "Count On Christmas" and "In the Market for a Miracle". In addition, three songs from the Broadway production were cut or reworked. "Overture" and "Parker Family Singalong" were both cut, while "Act One Finale" was reworked as "Ralphie's Nightmare". The song "Up on Santa's Lap" was included in the television broadcast but not included on the A Christmas Story Live! album.

Opening number
 "Count On Christmas" – Bebe Rexha

Act I
 "It All Comes Down to Christmas" – Ralphie, The Parkers and Ensemble
 "Red Ryder Carbine Action BB Gun" – Ralphie and Jean
 "The Genius on Cleveland Street" – The Old Man and Mother
 "When You're a Wimp" – Kids
 "Ralphie to the Rescue" – Ralphie, Miss Shields, The Parkers and Ensemble
 "What a Mother Does" – Mother
 "A Major Award" – The Old Man, Mother and Neighbors
 "Ralphie's Nightmare" – The Parkers
 "In the Market for a Miracle" – Mrs. Schwartz, Ralphie, Schwartz, Ensemble

Act 2
 "Sticky Situation" – Kids, Ensemble
 "You'll Shoot Your Eye Out" – Miss Shields and Kids
 "When You're a Wimp (reprise)" – Kids
 "Just Like That" – Mother
 "At Higbee's" – Elves
 "Up on Santa's Lap" – Santa, Elves, Ralphie, Randy and Kids
 "Before the Old Man Comes Home" – Ralphie and Randy
 "Somewhere Hovering Over Indiana" – Ralphie, Randy and Kids
 "Red Rider (reprise #3)" – Ralphie and The Old Man
 "Ralphie to the Rescue (reprise)" – Ralphie and Ensemble
 "A Christmas Story" – The Parkers and Full Company

Production
The production was based on A Christmas Story: The Musical, which in turn was based on the 1983 film. Marc Platt reprised his role as co-executive producer from the live television musical of Grease: Live (2016), joined by Adam Siegel, and television director Alex Rudzinski and theatrical director Scott Ellis. It was broadcast from the Warner Brothers Studios in Burbank, California, primarily using outdoor sets. Ellis noted that emphasis on the "feeling of family" was an important aspect of the production, as "it's not just razzle-dazzle stuff and big musical numbers. Our challenge is to never lose sight of the family aspect. And I think — I hope — we've succeeded in that". Songwriting duo Pasek & Paul, who wrote the songs for A Christmas Story: The Musical, wrote three new songs for the production, including "In the Market for a Miracle" for Mrs. Schwartz, "Ralphie's Nightmare" for the Parker family, and the opening theme "Count on Christmas".

Pasek noted that the team had to try to maintain a balance between preserving the familiar and iconic aspects of the film, while also expanding upon it through its musical format. He explained that "there are certain moments where we want to stay true to what people remember and then there's other moments where we have permission to do what only musical theater can do and turn the dad's fantasy into a tap dancing number". Platt remarked that, when working on a project such as this, "you prepare for the unknown. That's what makes live TV exciting. There are certain things that happen that you can't anticipate".

Unlike previous years, NBC did not broadcast a live musical for the 2017 holiday season; while it did plan to produce a version of Bye Bye Birdie executive-produced by and starring Jennifer Lopez, it was delayed and eventually abandoned. The broadcast ultimately competed against ABC's annual presentation of the film The Sound of Music, as well as NBC's Sunday Night Football between the Dallas Cowboys and Oakland Raiders.

During the special, Fox also broadcast a live, 2-and-a-half-minute commercial for The Greatest Showman, a then-upcoming musical film that also featured songs written by Pasek and Paul. The spot, which was directed by Michael Gracey and Beth McCarthy-Miller, and also simulcast on Facebook, featured a performance of the number "Come Alive" with the film's stars Hugh Jackman, Zac Efron, Keala Settle, and Zendaya. The presentation was billed as the first live television commercial for a film.

Reception

Critical response
A Christmas Story Live! received generally negative reviews, with the general audience reacting more harshly than professional critics. On Rotten Tomatoes, the production received a 43% rating based on 14 reviews. The show's three-hour length and musical numbers drew the most negative reactions, as Fox did not promote the program as a musical, and the lavish Broadway musical numbers were perceived to clash with the story's Midwestern setting. However, most of the individual actors' performances were positively received, as were the technical aspects of the special (such as scene and wardrobe changes).

The Los Angeles Times praised the performers: "...Matthew Broderick, who found his own, gentler way through Shepherd's pointy prose...Maya Rudolph was affecting as Ralphie's mother, Chris Diamantopoulos gruff if less than epic as his father, the Old Man...Andy Walken was a good visual match for the movie's Peter Billingsley,...The whole company of kids, in fact, was energetic and on their marks,...
Schwartz's mother, previously an offended voice on the other end of a phone call, was here gloriously embodied by Ana Gasteyer, who brought in a Hanukkah theme..." but noted that "...the virtues that have made the movie a seasonal perennial were somewhat swallowed by the narrative digressions and showstopping gestures of the musical".

Ratings
The overnight Nielsen ratings were a 2.8 rating/5 share with 4.52 million viewers, as compared to the Fox network live telecast of Grease: Live in January 2016, which earned a 7.4 overnight and 12 million viewers.

Fox reran A Christmas Story Live! in an edited two-hour time slot December 24, 2019. This telecast earned 1.11 million viewers, a 0.3 overnight rating and a 2 share. The rerun was also notable for going up against the original movie in the first airing of its annual marathon on TBS; the original drew more than twice the number of viewers.

Awards and nominations

See also
 2017 in American television
 List of Christmas television specials

References

External links
 
 

2010s American television specials
2017 in American television
2017 television films
2017 television specials
American live television shows
December 2017 events in the United States
English-language television shows
Films based on musicals based on films
Films based on multiple works
Films based on works by Jean Shepherd
Films set in Indiana
Fox television specials
Musical television films
Musical television specials
American Christmas television specials
Christmas musicals